Boris Johnson served as foreign secretary from 2016 until 2018. As a member of Theresa May's government, Johnson was appointed Foreign Secretary on 13 July 2016, shortly after May became prime minister following the resignation of David Cameron. He held the post until he resigned on 9 July 2018 in protest at the Chequers Plan and May's approach to Brexit, and was succeeded by Jeremy Hunt.

After May resigned in May 2019, Johnson won the Conservative leadership election to replace her, serving as Conservative leader and prime minister from July 2019 to September 2022.

Appointment 
After Theresa May had become Conservative Party leader and prime minister following David Cameron's resignation, she appointed Boris Johnson as Foreign Secretary on July 2016. Analysts saw the appointment as a tactic to weaken Johnson politically: the new positions of "Brexit secretary" and international trade secretary left the foreign secretary as a figurehead with few powers. Johnson's appointment ensured he would often be out of the country and unable to organise and mobilise backbenchers against her, while forcing him to take responsibility for problems caused by withdrawing from the EU.

Some journalists and foreign politicians criticised Johnson's appointment because of his history of controversial statements about other countries. His tenure in the role attracted criticism from diplomats and foreign policy experts. A number of diplomats, FCO staff and foreign ministers who worked with Johnson compared his leadership unfavourably to previous foreign secretaries for his perceived lack of conviction or substantive positions on British foreign policy issues. Former Swedish prime minister Carl Bildt said: "I wish it was a joke." A senior official in Obama's government suggested Johnson's appointment would push the US further towards Germany at the expense of the Special Relationship with the UK. On one occasion Egyptian president Abdel Fattah el-Sisi walked out of a meeting with Johnson after a meeting did not "get beyond the pleasantries".

Career 
Johnson's visit to Turkey from 25 to 27 September 2016 was somewhat tense because he had won Douglas Murray's offensive poetry competition about the President of Turkey, Recep Tayyip Erdoğan, four months earlier. When questioned by a journalist whether he would apologise for the poem, Johnson dismissed the matter as "trivia". Johnson pledged to help Turkey join the EU and expressed support for Erdogan's government. Johnson supported the Saudi Arabian-led intervention in Yemen and refused to block UK arms sales to Saudi Arabia, stating there was no clear evidence of breaches of international humanitarian law by Saudi Arabia in the war in Yemen. In September 2016, human rights groups accused him of blocking the UN inquiry into Saudi war crimes in Yemen. Given the UK-Saudi alliance, in December, he attracted attention for commenting the Saudis were akin to the Iranians in "puppeteering and playing proxy wars" throughout the Middle East. May said his comments did not represent the government's view.

In November 2017, Johnson told the Foreign Affairs Select Committee that Nazanin Zaghari-Ratcliffe—a British-Iranian dual citizen serving a five-year prison sentence in Iran after being arrested for training citizen journalists and bloggers in a BBC World Service Trust project—had been "simply teaching people journalism". Zaghari-Ratcliffe had said that her visit had been made simply for her daughter to meet her grandparents. Facing criticism, Johnson stated he had been misquoted and that nothing he said had justified Zaghari-Ratcliffe's sentence. In May 2018, Johnson backed the Iran nuclear deal framework, despite Donald Trump's withdrawal. Johnson said the deal brought economic benefits to the Iranian people. Johnson described the Gülen movement as a "cult" and supported Turkey's post-coup purges. He said that Turkey's coup attempt "was deeply violent, deeply anti-democratic, deeply sinister and it was totally right that it was crushed".

In April 2017, Johnson said that Gibraltar's sovereignty was "not going to change" after Brexit. Johnson promised while in Northern Ireland that Brexit would leave the Irish border "absolutely unchanged". In May 2017, during the 2017 United Kingdom general election, a woman criticised him for discussing ending tariffs on Indian whisky in a Sikh temple in Bristol (Sikhism prohibits alcohol use). He later expressed regret that the protester held differing views to his on alcohol.

Johnson visited the islands of Anguilla, and Tortola (in the British Virgin Islands) on 13 September 2017 to confirm the United Kingdom's commitment to helping restore British territories devastated by Hurricane Irma. He said he was reminded of photos of Hiroshima after the atom bomb had landed on it.

In September 2017, he was criticised for reciting lines from Rudyard Kipling's poem Mandalay while visiting a Myanmartemple; the British ambassador, who was with him, suggested it was "not appropriate". In October 2017, he faced criticism for stating the Libyan city of Sirte could become an economic success like Dubai: "all they have to do is clear the dead bodies away". Johnson did not condemn the actions of the Spanish government and police during the outlawed Catalan independence referendum on 1 October 2017.

Initially favouring a less hostile approach to Russia, Johnson soon backed a more aggressive policy towards Russia. Following the March 2018 poisoning of Sergei and Yulia Skripal in Salisbury, an act which the UK government blamed on Russia, Johnson compared Vladimir Putin's hosting of the World Cup in Russia to Adolf Hitler's hosting of the Olympic Games in Berlin in 1936. Russia's Foreign Ministry denounced Johnson's "unacceptable and unworthy" parallel towards Russia, a "nation that lost millions of lives in fighting Nazism". Johnson described the Nord Stream 2 gas pipeline from Russia to Germany as "divisive" and a "threat" that left Europe dependent on a "malign Russia" for its energy supplies.

Johnson condemned the persecution of Rohingya Muslims in Myanmar, comparing the situation with the displacement of Palestinians in 1948. Johnson supported the Turkish invasion of northern Syria aimed at ousting the Syrian Kurds from the enclave of Afrin.

In a September 2017 op-ed, Johnson reiterated the UK would regain control of £350m a week after Brexit, suggesting it go to the National Health Service (NHS). Cabinet colleagues subsequently criticised him for reviving the assertion and accused of "clear misuse of official statistics" by the chair of the UK Statistics Authority, Sir David Norgrove. The authority rejected the suggestion that it was quibbling over newspaper headlines and not Johnson's actual words. Following the 2017 general election, Johnson denied media reports he intended to challenge May's leadership. In a February 2018 letter to May, Johnson suggested that Northern Ireland may have to accept border controls after Brexit and that it would not seriously affect trade, having initially said a hard border would be unthinkable.

In March 2018, Johnson apologised for his "inadvertent sexism" after being criticised for calling Shadow Foreign Secretary Emily Thornberry as "Lady Nugee"; Thornberry was married to Christopher Nugee but did not use his surname. In June, he was reported as having said "fuck business" when asked about corporate concerns regarding a 'hard' Brexit.

Johnson said that US recognition of Jerusalem as Israel's capital is a "moment of opportunity" for peace. In June 2018, Johnson accused the UNHRC of focusing disproportionately on the Israeli–Palestinian conflict and Israel's occupation of the Palestinian territories.

Secret recordings obtained by BuzzFeed News in June 2018 revealed Johnson's dissatisfaction with Prime Minister Theresa May's negotiating style, accusing her of being too collaborative with the European Union in Brexit negotiations. Comparing May's approach to that of the US President Donald Trump – who at the time was engaged in a combative trade war with the EU because it raised tariffs on metal – Johnson said: "Imagine Trump doing Brexit. He'd go in bloody hard ... There'd be all sorts of breakdowns, all sorts of chaos. Everyone would think he'd gone mad. But actually you might get somewhere. It's a very, very good thought." He also called Philip Hammond and the Treasury "the heart of Remain" and accused individuals of scaremongering over a Brexit "meltdown", saying "No panic. Pro bono publico, no bloody panic. It's going to be all right in the end."

During trips to the United States as foreign secretary, Johnson had repeated meetings with Trump adviser and speechwriter Stephen Miller, which were held off White House grounds and kept quiet from May. During the meetings, Miller and Johnson "swapped speech-writing ideas and tips".

In July 2018, three days after the cabinet had its meeting at Chequers to agree on a Brexit strategy, Johnson, along with Brexit Secretary David Davis, resigned his post.

Post-foreign secretary 

In 2019, a year after his resignation as foreign secretary, Johnson was elected Conservative leader, and succeeded May as prime minister. Parliament ratified Johnson's Brexit withdrawal agreement, and the UK left the European Union on 31 January 2020, beginning an eleven-month transition period. In March 2020, Johnson responded to the COVID-19 pandemic by enacting emergency powers and widespread societal measures including several lockdowns, and approved a vaccination programme.

Johnson's premiership was characterised by a string of political controversies and scandals, including the revelation that Johnson and his government held several non-socially distanced gatherings at 10 Downing Street during 2020 and 2021. Following the July 2022 United Kingdom government crisis, Johnson announced his forthcoming resignation on 7 July 2022, and remained as prime minister in a caretaker role until 6 September 2022. He was succeeded by Liz Truss, his foreign secretary.

References 
2010s in the United Kingdom
History of the Conservative Party (UK)
Johnson
Tenures in political office by individual
Boris Johnson
Early lives of the prime ministers of the United Kingdom